SMAP was a Japanese boy band formed by Johnny & Associates.

SMAP may also refer to:
 Simple Mail Access Protocol, an Internet protocol for email delivery
 Soil Moisture Active Passive, an American environmental research satellite
 Supervisor Mode Access Prevention, a computer processor feature